Obama Eksklusif RCTI Bersama Putra Nababan ("Putra Nababan Exclusive Interview with Barack Obama on RCTI") is a special television program showing an interview between Indonesian journalist Putra Nababan and President Barack Obama which aired on RCTI in March 2010. According to the president, this show was the first interview ever done by Indonesian television in the White House. The interview covered the partnership between Indonesia and the United States and the president's experiences during his childhood in Indonesia.

Obama also confirmed a delay in his planned visit to Indonesia due to the health care vote that was to be held by the US Congress at that time.

This show won an award at the 2011 Panasonic Gobel Awards.

Awards

References

External links 
 Wawancara Eksklusif RCTI dengan Barack Obama Part 1 Part 2 Part 3 Part 4

RCTI original programming
Works by Barack Obama
Interviews
2010 television specials
Indonesia–United States relations